Brestenberg Castle is a castle and manor house near the municipality of Seengen in the canton of Aargau, Switzerland. It is open to the public and today houses a museum and a cafe.

History

See also
List of castles and fortresses in Switzerland

External links
 Schloss Brestenberg

Castles in Aargau